Hypolepis poeppigii is a fern species in the family Dennstaedtiaceae that has no common name.

It was first described by German botanist Georg Heinrich Mettenius, but his description was not considered validly published, and American botanist William Ralph Maxon later described the species in a valid publication.

Distribution
The fern is found in the Neotropical realm within South America.  Places it is native to include the Argentina, Chile, Peru, and Falkland Islands.

Description
Hypolepis poeppigii has either individual antheridia or antheridia grouped on an antheridiophore.

References

Bibliography

Dennstaedtiaceae
Flora of western South America
Ferns of Argentina
Ferns of Chile
Flora of Peru
Flora of the Falkland Islands
Ferns of the Americas
Plants described in 1834